Janthinoidea is a superfamily of sea snails containing wentletraps (Epitoniidae) and surfing snails (Janthinidae).  It includes species that have tethered egg masses, some of which are used for flotation.

Phylogeny
Molecular evidence supports a tree for Janthinoidea that shows the sequential development of traits for a neustonic life.  The wentletraps (Epitoniidae) have tethered egg masses that started to be used for flotation in Recluzia and then totally divorce from its original function for the ovoviviparous Janthina janthina.

Taxonomy
Janthinoidea includes the following families, genera, and species.
Epitoniidae
Acrilla
Acrilla acuminata
Alexania
Alexania inazawai
Cirsotrema
Cirsotrema multiperforata
Cirsotrema varicosum
Cycloscala
Cycloscala crenulata
Epidendrium
Epidendrium aureum
Epidendrium sordidum
Epifungium
Epifungium adgranulosa
Epifungium adgravis
Epifungium adscabra
Epifungium hartogi
Epifungium hoeksemai
Epifungium lochi
Epifungium marki
Epifungium nielsi
Epifungium pseudolochi
Epifungium pseudotwilae
Epifungium twilae
Epifungium ulu
Epitonium
Epitonium ancillotoi
Epitonium angulatum
Epitonium clathratulum
Epitonium clathrus
Epitonium cf. jukesianum
Epitonium jukesianum
Epitonium replicatum
Epitonium sawinae
Epitonium scalare
Epitonium tinctum
Epitonium trevelyanum
Gyroscala
Gyroscala lamellosa
Opalia
Opalia chacei
Opalia gracilis
Surrepifungium
Surrepifungium costulatum
Surrepifungium ingridae
Surrepifungium oliverioi
Surrepifungium patamakanthini
Janthinidae
Janthina
Janthina exigua 
Janthina janthina
Janthina cf. prolongata CKC-2011
Janthina umbilicata
Recluzia
Recluzia cf. jehennei CKC-2011

References

External links
 Janthinoidea at UniProt

Taxa named by Jean-Baptiste Lamarck
Gastropods described in 1810
Ptenoglossa